The 2008 Dubai 24 Hour was an 24 hour automobile endurance race and the third running of the Dubai 24 Hour. The event was held on 10 to 12 January at the Dubai Autodrome, United Arab Emirates. The winning car was an A6 class Porsche RSR run by VIP Pet Foods and shared between Australian drivers Tony Quinn, Klark Quinn, Craig Baird from New Zealand and Jonathon Webb of Australia.

Result

References

Dubai 24 Hour
Dubai 24 Hour
Dubai 24 Hour